La Garde (Provençal Occitan: La Garda) is a seaside commune in the Var department in the Provence-Alpes-Côte d'Azur region in Southeastern France.

It is located in the Métropole Toulon Provence Méditerranée, east of the city of Toulon. In 2019, it had a population of 25,505.

History
The name derives from the town's ancient origins, meaning "The Guard". It is mentioned in 1056, when its castle was a fief of the Bishops of Toulon; they kept it until the 13th century, when it was handed over to the Castellanes, then the lords of Glandevès and the Thomas. Today only a tower and the chapel remain of the castle.

La Garde was repeatedly invaded during the French Wars of Religion. In 1707 it was sacked by Savoyard troops.

Demographics

International relations

La Garde, Var is twinned with:

See also
Communes of the Var department

References

External links

 Official website 

Communes of Var (department)